Markovnikov is a Russian masculine surname, which originates from морковь (carrot); its feminine counterpart is Markovnikova. It may refer to
Vladimir Markovnikov (1837–1904), Russian chemist
Nikolai Markovnikov (1869–1942), Russian architect and archaeologist, son of Vladimir

See also
Markovnikov's rule in chemistry, established by Vladimir Markovnikov

Russian-language surnames